Juan José Timón (18 November 1937 – 13 July 2001) was a Uruguayan cyclist. He competed at the 1960 Summer Olympics and the 1964 Summer Olympics.

References

External links
 

1937 births
2001 deaths
Uruguayan male cyclists
Olympic cyclists of Uruguay
Cyclists at the 1960 Summer Olympics
Cyclists at the 1964 Summer Olympics
People from Fray Bentos
Pan American Games medalists in cycling
Pan American Games gold medalists for Uruguay
Pan American Games silver medalists for Uruguay
Competitors at the 1959 Pan American Games
Cyclists at the 1963 Pan American Games
Medalists at the 1959 Pan American Games
Medalists at the 1963 Pan American Games